White Woman is a 1933 American pre-Code drama film directed by Stuart Walker and starring Carole Lombard, Charles Laughton, and Charles Bickford. The screenplay concerns a young widow who remarries and accompanies her husband to his remote jungle rubber plantation.

One of hundreds of Paramount films held in limbo by Universal Studios, Universal gained ownership of Paramount features produced between 1929 and 1949. Paramount remade the film in 1939 as Island of Lost Men, with Anna May Wong, J. Carrol Naish and Broderick Crawford in the roles originated by Lombard, Laughton and Bickford. It was directed by Kurt Neumann.

Plot

Cast
Carole Lombard as Judith Denning
Charles Laughton as Horace H. Prin
Charles Bickford as Ballister
Kent Taylor as David von Elst
Percy Kilbride as Jakey
James Bell as Hambly
Charles Middleton as Fenton (as Charles B. Middleton)
Claude King as C. M. Chisholm
Ethel Griffies as Mrs. Chisholm
Marc Lawrence as Connors

Other uncredited cast members (alphabetically) 
Noble Johnson as Native Chief
Tetsu Komai as Chisholm Servant
Victor Wong as Waiter

References

External links

 (source material)

1933 films
1933 drama films
American black-and-white films
American drama films
American films based on plays
Films directed by Stuart Walker
Films set in Malaysia
Paramount Pictures films
1930s English-language films
1930s American films